GCIDE is the GNU version of Collaborative International Dictionary of English, derived from the 1913 edition of Webster's Revised Unabridged Dictionary and WordNet. The dictionary is released under the GNU General Public License.

It describes itself as "a freely-available set of ASCII files containing the marked-up text of a substantial English dictionary".

See also 

 GNU Aspell, a spellchecker

References

External links 

 GCIDE homepage
 GCIDE FTP site
 GCIDE_XML - An XML version of the dictionary, along with an online search facility.
 GNU Dico web search

GNU Project
Online English dictionaries